Aq Bolagh-e Latgah (also Romanized as Āq Bolāgh-e Latgāh; also known as Āq Bolāgh) is a village in Mohajeran Rural District, Lalejin District, Bahar County, Hamadan Province, Iran. At the 2006 census, its population was 760, in 193 families.

References 

Populated places in Bahar County